No Room for the Groom is a 1952 American comedy film directed by Douglas Sirk and starring Tony Curtis, Piper Laurie, Don DeFore and Spring Byington. The screenplay is based on the novel "My True Love" by Darwin Teilhet.

Plot
Vineyard owner Alvah Morrell and his girlfriend Lee Kingshead elope to Las Vegas before he must return to active military duty. They are unable to have a honeymoon because Alvah comes down with a case of chicken pox and Lee must be quarantined from him.

Alvah leaves for 10 months. During this time, Lee finds no suitable way or time to tell her manipulative mother about the marriage. Mama pretends to have fainting spells and hides her personal foibles, which include smoking and gambling.

Mama's goal is to marry Lee to the wealthy Herman Strouple, who owns a thriving cement business. Mama hopes to keep the married couple apart so that their union will never be consummated and can be legally annulled.

By the time Alvah returns, so many people are pressuring him to sell his vineyard land and home to Herman that he feels alone, particularly when others conspire to have Alvah declared mentally ill and unable to conduct his own affairs. He must trust Lee to do the right thing, and soon they're finally spending their first night together.

Cast
 Tony Curtis as Alvah Morrell
 Piper Laurie as Lee Kingshead
 Don DeFore as Herman Strouple
 Spring Byington as Mama Kingshead
 Lillian Bronson as Aunt Elsa
 Paul McVey as Dr. Trotter
 Stephen Chase as Mr. Taylor
 Lee Aaker as Donovan
 Jack Kelly as Will Stubbins
 Frank Sully as Cousin Luke

See also
 List of American films of 1952

References

External links

 

1952 films
Films scored by Frank Skinner
American comedy films
1952 comedy films
American black-and-white films
1950s English-language films
1950s American films